Zbigniew Kaczmarek may refer to:

 Zbigniew Kaczmarek (weightlifter) (born 1946), Polish weightlifter, Olympic medalist
 Zbigniew Kaczmarek (footballer) (born 1962), Polish football player